Dave Collins is a British radio DJ who has broadcast across a number of radio stations in his career including Voice of Peace and Radio Caroline and a dozen radio stations in the UK.

Career
Dave was born in Liverpool and worked as a carpenter/joiner for Liverpool City Council. He gained a City and Guilds qualification in his trade. In his spare time, he worked on various landbased pirate radio stations in Liverpool such as Radio Elenore (he was owner/programme manager after Peanut Kenny decided to quit radio). He also spent a short period of time working on ABC Radio in Dublin in the early 80's and on Radio West in Mullingar in Ireland.

The Voice of Peace
In 1984, he joined The Voice of Peace radio station in Israel. He was known on the peace station run by Abie Nathan and broadcast from the East Mediterranean as Paul Rogers, the same name he used on Radio Elenore in Liverpool.

Radio Caroline
On the world famous station Radio Caroline, he was the first to be heard on the radio in the early hours of 7 August 1985 as Dave Collins.  Caroline DJs on board the ship at this historic time included Susan Charles, Peter Philips, Johnny Lewis and David Andrews.

Others
Following Radio Caroline, he enjoyed another spell in Ireland, on the breakfast show at Radio West in Mullingar and then working in the UK on more than a dozen radio stations. He has presented at many radio stations in the UK including Marcher Sound in Wrexham, Radio City in Liverpool, Red Rose in Preston, CFM Carlisle and Wire FM. Moving also in radio management, he was Head Of Presentation at CFM, Programme Controller at The Bay in Lancaster and Programme Manager at Alpha FM in Darlington. After this period in radio presenting and management, he moved into various sales roles including media sales in York at The Press newspaper and radio sales as Sales Accounts Manager for Yorkshire Coast Radio in Scarborough, Minster FM in York and Viking FM/Magic 1161 in Hull.

Dave also broadcast again on Radio Caroline, from a ship docked at Albert Dock in Liverpool from March 31, 2014. This was a RSL called Caroline North Liverpool on broadcast on 87.7FM. The station was a success and Dave also had the not so easy task of managing the media sales.

Following his days in offshore radio on Radio Caroline, VOP and Radio Seagull, Dave has also been included in The Pirate Radio Hall Of Fame.

Personal life
In February 2008, after leaving Wire FM, he went on a travelling around the world with his partner.

He currently lives in Brussels working in print and digital marketing sales at The Brussels Times as Sales Operations Manager.

References

British radio DJs
1962 births
Living people
Radio presenters from Liverpool